Kerry Properties Limited is a listed company engaged in  property development in Hong Kong, Mainland China and Asia Pacific region; infrastructure projects in Hong Kong and Mainland China; and hotel ownership and operations in Mainland China. They formerly also engaged in third-party logistics, freight services and warehouse operations, however the former subsidiary was listed on 19 December 2013, under the name Kerry Logistics Network.

Its largest shareholder is the family of Robert Kuok, a Malaysian Chinese businessman and the founder of Shangri-La Hotels and Resorts. 
It incorporated in Bermuda with limited liability and was listed on the Hong Kong Stock Exchange in 1996.

Its head office is in Quarry Bay.

See also 
 Shangri-La Hotels

References

External links

Kerry Properties Limited

 
Real estate companies established in 1978
Land developers of Hong Kong
Companies listed on the Hong Kong Stock Exchange
Offshore companies of Bermuda
1978 establishments in Hong Kong